Nicholas J. Maiale (born August 1, 1951) is a former Democratic member of the Pennsylvania House of Representatives. He is a native of Philadelphia.

References

Democratic Party members of the Pennsylvania House of Representatives
1951 births
Living people
Politicians from Philadelphia